Geoffrey Campbell McComas AM (2 May 19528 January 2005) was an Australian comedian, writer and actor.

Early life and education
McComas attended Caulfield Grammar School and Scotch College in Hawthorn, Melbourne, and studied law and arts at Monash University.

Career
After practising law for several years, he became one of Australia's most renowned public speakers and comedians.

McComas's start in comedy was in May 1976, when he made his famous hoax lecture at Monash pretending to be Glanville Williams, "alternative professor of English law at University of Cambridge". The lecture was given to around 450 students, though it has often been remarked that thousands of people claim to have attended the lecture. Even those who knew Williams were reportedly fooled by the hoax. McComas then made a professional career out of similar stunts, hired by various organizations to perform in character as a "guest speaker".

McComas is probably best known to the wider general public, however, through his chairing televised comedy "debates" at the Melbourne International Comedy Festival. He regularly appeared on ABC radio, and created over 1800 characters for impersonations. In 2004, he was made a Member of the Order of Australia for his service to entertainment.

McComas died in early 2005 after a short battle with leukaemia. He was survived by his wife, Wendy, and son from his first marriage, Alistair, who was also a law student at Monash.

See also
 List of Caulfield Grammar School people

References 

Selma Milovanovic and Xavier La Canna. "McComas the chameleon dies at 52". The Age
Obituary. Speakers New Zealand
Australian ABC Radio National feature.

1952 births
2005 deaths
Deaths from leukemia
Comedians from Melbourne
Australian male comedians
Monash Law School alumni
People educated at Caulfield Grammar School
Deaths from cancer in Victoria (Australia)
People educated at Scotch College, Melbourne
Members of the Order of Australia
20th-century Australian comedians
Radio personalities from Melbourne